William Bridges (1579–1626) was an English Anglican priest in the 17th century.

Rye was born in Middlesex and educated at New College, Oxford. He was appointed Archdeacon of Oxford in 1614 and held the position until his death.

References

1579 births
1626 deaths
17th-century English Anglican priests
Archdeacons of Oxford
Alumni of New College, Oxford
People from Middlesex